Teretrurus is a genus of nonvenomous shield tail snakes which are endemic to the central and southern western ghats of India. Currently, 4 species are recognized.

Species
Teretrurus hewstoni (Beddome, 1876) -found in Wayanad range of western ghats.
Teretrurus rhodogaster Wall, 1921 – Palni Mountain burrowing snake, red-bellied shieldtail, Wall's shield tail snake  Occurs in southern India, in the Western Ghats encompassing the Palni Hills
Teretrurus sanguineus (Beddome, 1867) – purple-red earth snake  Occurs in southern India in the Manimuthar Hills, and Nyamakad
Teretrurus travancoricus (Beddome, 1886) – travancore earth snake,found in Southern western ghats,south of shengottai gap.

References

 

Uropeltidae
Snake genera